Indonesia–Philippines relations are the bilateral relations between Indonesia and the Philippines. The two countries established diplomatic relations in 1949. Since then, both countries enjoy cordial bilateral relationship in spirit of kinship. The two countries are considered allies and it is considered as one of the most important bilateral relationships in ASEAN. Both countries have established embassies in each capitals, Indonesia has their embassy in Manila and consulate general in Davao City, while Philippines has their embassy in Jakarta and consulate general in Manado. High rank stately visits have been conducted for years.

Both nations are the founders of ASEAN and the members of Non-Aligned Movement and APEC. Both countries are members of the East ASEAN Growth Triangle together with Brunei Darussalam and Malaysia in the BIMP-EAGA. Both countries are mainly composed of islands and they both reject territorial claims of the People's Republic of China in the region.

Philippines and Indonesia also share several non-traditional security concerns, including climate change, terrorism, and economic recovery from the COVID-19 pandemic amid the Russo-Ukrainian war and the tension in the Taiwan Strait.

Culture

Linguistic diversity 
Both countries have massive amounts of languages, for example, Indonesia has about 700 languages, while Philippines has over 180 languages spoken in the country.

Ethnic groups 
Both countries have massive amounts of ethnic groups, Philippines has about 182 ethnic groups, while Indonesia has about 1,300, most of whom speak Austronesian languages.

Similarities

Land 
Both countries are an archipelago, and have massive amounts of islands, Indonesia has 17,000 islands, about 6,000 of which are inhabited. the biggest islands are Sumatra, Java, Kalimantan, Sulawesi, and the Indonesian part of New Guinea. Philippines however has 7,641 islands. Many people remember it having 7,107, but in 2016 the National Mapping and Resource Information recently discovered 500 new islands.

Season 
Both countries are a Tropical archipelagos. It does not snow in Indonesia and Philippines. There are only 2 seasons, which are Rainy seasons and Dry seasons.

Colonization & Invasions 
Both countries were colonized by European powers.

  Spanish East Indies – Spanish colony from 1565 to 1898
  – Dutch colony from 1602 to 1949 (included Netherlands New Guinea until 1962)

Both countries were invaded by Japan in 1941-1942 and occupied until 1945.

 Philippines campaign
 Dutch East Indies campaign

Language 
The languages Filipino and Indonesian have some similarities in words.

Dictatorships and revolutions 
Both countries were ruled by Dictators following decolonization, which ruled for decades until they were overthrown in popular revolutions which paved the way for democracy.

Philippines 
  Dictatorial Government (1898) – rule by Emilio Aguinaldo that also announced the Philippine Declaration of Independence.
  New Society Regime (1972–1986) – rule by Ferdinand Marcos from the announcement of the Proclamation No. 1081 until his removal from power following the People Power Revolution.

Indonesia 
  Guided Democracy Regime (1959–1966) – rule by Sukarno from the announcement of his 1959 Decree until his fall from power during the Transition to the New Order.
  New Order Regime (1966–1998) – rule by Suharto from his Rise to Power until his Resignation from office following violent protests.

Both the Marcos and Suharto regimes were known for their extreme corruption, with the Marcos family embezzling from US$5 billion to $13 billion, and the Suharto family embezzling from US$15 billion to $35 billion.

Women Leaders 
Both countries elected women to become presidents.

  Corazon Aquino (1986–1992) – replaced Ferdinand Marcos after the People Power Revolution. She is the mother of former president Benigno Aquino III.
  Gloria Macapagal Arroyo (2001–2010) – replaced Joseph Estrada after his Ouster and Resignation. She is the daughter of former president Diosdado Macapagal.
  Megawati Sukarnoputri (2001–2004) – replaced Abdurrahman Wahid after his Impeachment. She is the daughter of former president Sukarno.

Other 
Both the Philippines and Indonesia are known to have high amounts of workers emigrating to territories such as Hong Kong, usually to work unskilled labour roles such as domestic servants.

History

Ancient era
Indonesia and the Philippines are both archipelagic countries with ethnic populations and national languages that have common Austronesian ancestry. The historical links between ancient Indonesia and the Philippines have commenced since around the 9th century. The Laguna Copperplate Inscription dated from 900 CE mentioned the Javanese Medang Kingdom and the Srivijaya Empire. The writing system used is the Kawi Script, while the language is a variety of Old Malay, and contains numerous loanwords from Sanskrit and a few non-Malay vocabulary elements whose origin is between Old Tagalog and Old Javanese. The 14th century Nagarakretagama manuscript written during the height of Majapahit empire, mentioned several states that is now Philippines; Kalka, Selurong (Manila), and Solot (Sulu), suggested that Majapahit empire influences had reached the Philippine archipelago.

Various Philippine legends also refer to Indonesia as a place of ancestral origin. According to Visayan folklore, during the Chola occupation of Sumatra, a minor prince by the name of Rajamuda Lumaya was sent to establish a vassal state and a base. Known better by the name Sri Lumay, he reached what is today Cebu, establishing the Rajahnate of Cebu and ruling with his sons Sri Alho and Sri Bantug. The Kedatuan of Madja-as, an ancient confederation in what is today Western Visayas and the Negros Island Region, was a vassal state of the Srivijaya Empire.

Age of Islam

During the age of Islamic sultanates in Southeast Asia, many Islamic missionaries from present-day Indonesia (as well as Malaysia) migrated to the southern Philippines to preach Islam. In 1390 CE, Rajah Baguinda, also a native of Sumatra helped form a polity in the Sulu Archipelago which would become a preceding state to the Sultanate of Sulu.

The Sultanate of Sulu would cover an area, that includes the modern-day Philippine islands of the Sulu Archipelago, Palawan, the Malaysian state of Sabah and the Indonesian province of North Kalimantan.

European occupation
In the 16th century the two realms were divided under European colonial powers; Philippines archipelago was held under Spanish Empire while on the south the Moluccas spice islands (now Eastern parts of Indonesia) was under Portuguese possession, later wrestled by Dutch Empire. European colonials identify both archipelagic realms as East Indies, Spanish East Indies and Dutch East Indies. The natives of the Moluccas of Indonesia referred to the Philippine island of Mindanao as "Maluku Besar" or "Greater Moluccas".

From 1925 to 1926, Indonesian national hero and former PKI member Tan Malaka lived in Manila. There he became a correspondent of the nationalist newspaper El Debate, edited by Francisco Varona. Publication of Malaka's works, such as a second edition of Naar de Republiek Indonesia (December 1925) and Semangat Moeda (Young Spirit; 1926) might have been supported by Varona. There Malaka also met Mariano de los Santos, José Abad Santos, and Crisanto Evangelista.

Modern-day

Since Indonesia's proclamation of independence on 17 August 1945 and the Philippines independence on 4 July 1946, the old cordial relationship between Indonesians and the Filipinos are reestablished. On November 24, 1949, the two countries established diplomatic relations. Since 1949, the Indonesian Government has opened its representative office (Consular Office) in Manila but it was not until the early 1950s that a diplomatic office (embassy) was established headed by an Ambassador. To institutionalize the relations between the two countries, a treaty of friendship was signed on 21 June 1951. This Treaty constituted the basic relationship of both countries, covering several aspects such as maintenance of peace and friendship, settlement of disputes by diplomatic and peaceful means, traffic arrangements for citizens of both countries and activities to promote cooperation in the area of trade, cultural, shipping, etc. which include the political, social-economic and security matters of both countries. In 1967, both countries together with Thailand, Singapore and Malaysia founded ASEAN to ensure the peace and stability in the region.

In 2010, an Indonesian photographer by the name of Ilham Anas (known for his physical resemblance to Barack Obama) starred in a Philippine Domperidone commercial, impersonating Obama. In 2012, Indonesian television producers spawned their national franchise of the Philippine game-television show Eat Bulaga!, known as Eat Bulaga! Indonesia. The first Indonesian version adopted many activities and game segments from their original Philippine counterpart, before switching TV stations and adding their own twists.

However, with the case of Mary Jane Veloso, a Filipina death-row inmate in Indonesia convicted of drug trafficking, relations between the two nations may take a minor strain. Veloso has however requested her family and the Philippine government not to damage the Indonesia–Philippines relations. In the end, Veloso's execution was further delayed on the day she was scheduled to be executed.

In 2016, in an effort to improve the country's maritime capabilities, the Philippine Navy purchased its newest warship, the BRP Tarlac, from Indonesia. It is based on the Makassar-class ships used by the Indonesian Navy. The ship was built by PT PAL Indonesia, in Surabaya, East Java where it is to be exported from. This would enable the Philippines to rely less on foreign allies for military maritime transport.

In June 2016, economic relations between Indonesia and the Philippines took a minor strain, when the Indonesian officials suspended coal exports to the Philippines. This decision was made after 7 Indonesian sailors carrying boats of coal en route to the Philippines were kidnapped by Filipino militants in the Sulu Sea. It is unknown of whether the militants were part of the Abu Sayyaf. Indonesian minister for foreign affairs Retno Marsudi stated that the moratorium would last until the Philippine government could provide confident security to Indonesian nationals. Indonesia currently is the Philippines' biggest supplier of coal, approximately 70%.

In January 2017, the Philippines granted residence permits to persons of Indonesian descent (PIDs) and stateless people with Indonesian ancestry living in southern Philippines.

Trade
According to the Indonesian Ministry of Trade, that figure has gone from $1.12 billion in 2003 to $2.9 billion in 2009 and $3.89 billion in 2010. Indonesia is currently the Philippines' biggest supplier of coal, exporting about 70% of the Philippines' coal imports. In June 2016, Indonesian coal exports to the Philippines was put under a moratorium due to the growing concern of piracy in the Sulu Sea. That being said, the total trade between the two countries is in excess of $5.2 billion in 2016 with the balance of trade significantly favoring Indonesia, whose exports to Philippines compose over 85% of said figure. The first Indonesian warship to be exported was also delivered to the Philippines in May 2016. During 2020, Indonesia had a large net trade with Philippines in the exports of Transportation ($1.94B), Mineral Products ($1.46B), and Foodstuffs ($803M). Philippines also had a large net trade with Indonesia during 2020 in the exports of Machines ($211M), Chemical Products ($77.6M), and Metals ($72.3M).

Tourism
During the ASEAN Tourism Forum 2012 in Manado, North Sulawesi, the governments of Indonesia and the Philippines initiated their very first bilateral tourism cooperation. This initiative will improve connectivity between the two countries by operating cruise ships and the renewal of direct flights between Davao in the Philippines to Manado.

Transportation
The two countries are also actively supporting the Master Plan of ASEAN Connectivity, which will enhance greater mobility within the region. The Philippines in particular is eager to develop the ASEAN Roll-On/Roll-Off (RORO) Network and Short Sea Shipping. In April 2017, the new shipping route connecting Davao in the Philippines with Bitung in Indonesia was inaugurated. This shipping route is within the BIMP-EAGA agreement and expected to boost Indonesia-Philippines trade relations.

In an effort to improve and modernise their railway service, the Philippine National Railways has bought diesel multiple unit train sets from PT INKA Indonesia, and deployed in December 2019.

Cooperation against border terrorism and separatism
Indonesia and the Philippines are working hand-in-hand to explore ways of cooperation to combat terrorism and other forms of transnational crimes threatening their borders and more broadly within Southeast Asia. Indonesia's president has expressed his country's readiness to assist the Philippine government in peace talks with Islamist separatist groups active in its borders. Likewise, the Philippines helped Indonesia in its own negotiations with rebels, serving as a monitor during the Aceh Peace Process in 2005.

The Indonesian-Philippines naval border areas in Sulawesi Sea near Sulu archipelago and Mindanao waters are known as the piracy hotspots as well as terrorist's corridor. The Islamist militant operating in Poso, Central Sulawesi, has established relations with their Islamist terrorist counterparts in Sulu and Mindanao areas in Southern Philippines. Arms supply for Poso Islamist guerillas are suspected has been supplied by arm dealer operating in the Philippines blackmarket. On 26 March 2016, 10 Indonesian sailors were held hostage by Islamist militant group Abu Sayyaf operating in Sulu archipelago in southern Philippines. The Indonesian vessels were freighting coal from South Borneo heading for Batangas port was hijacked near Sulu waters. The Philippines and Indonesian authority has been working together to crack down this hostage crisis. On 2 May 2016, 10 of Indonesian sailor hostages were released by their captors.

Boundary agreement
Indonesia and Philippines share maritime borders mainly on Sulawesi Sea. In the past both countries involved in territorial disputes over Miangas island (Island of Palmas Case). It was fought between the Netherlands and the United States and won by Netherlands East Indies in 1932. Today there is no territorial disputes between Indonesia and Philippines. In March 2011, leaders from both countries agreed to sign a memorandum of understanding to boost cooperation in security, defense, boundary delimitation, protection of migrant workers, education and sports. Indonesia is keeping its support for the Philippine proposal to delineate and segregate the disputed parts of the South China Sea from the undisputed areas in drafting the Code of Conduct that will bind countries with territorial claims in the Spratlys group of islands.

On May 23, 2014, the Philippines and Indonesia signed a historic agreement that drew a boundary between the two countries. Philippine Foreign Affairs Secretary Albert del Rosario and his Indonesian counterpart, Foreign Minister Marty Natalegawa, inked the deal in Manila with Philippine President Benigno Aquino III and Indonesian President Susilo Bambang Yudhoyono as witnesses. The EEZ is an area 200 nautical miles from a coastal state's baselines, or edges, within which the state has the sovereign rights to explore and exploit, and conserve and manage natural resources, among others. “The conclusion of the negotiations attests to the friendship, patience, goodwill, and commitment of the governments of the Philippines and Indonesia to peacefully address maritime issues,” said Foreign Affairs Undersecretary Evan Garcia, who led the Philippine team in negotiations.

Disaster reliefs
Both Indonesia and Philippines archipelago are prone to natural disasters, such as volcanic eruptions, earthquakes, tsunamis and storms (typhoons, tornadoes, etc.). In spirits of solidarity and humanity both countries often help each other in times of need. The Indonesian government on Monday December 10, 2012 came to the aid of thousands of typhoon “Pablo” (Bopha) victims in the Visayas and Mindanao, donating $1 million and four tons of relief items through the Armed Forces of the Philippines. Besides the financial aid, the Indonesian government also gave 1,000 military blankets, 3,000 packs of ready-to-eat meals and 50 boxes of instant noodles.

In November 2013, Indonesian Government sent humanitarian aid of goods and logistics worth  to help the victims of Typhoon Haiyan in Central Philippines as part of ASEAN solidarity. Indonesian Red Cross also sent 688,862 tonnes emergency supplies. Three Indonesian Air Force Hercules aircraft deployed with supplies to affected areas. Logistical aid including aircraft, food, generators and medicine. The Indonesian Red Cross deployed KM Emir cargo ship loaded with emergency supplies and also 30 Indonesian Red Cross volunteers.

See also
Indonesia–Philippines border
Brunei, Indonesia, Malaysia, Philippines East ASEAN Growth Area
Filipinos in Indonesia
Overseas Filipino Worker (OFW)
Indonesians in the Philippines
Indonesian Migrant Worker (TKI)
Maphilindo
List of ambassadors of Indonesia to the Philippines

Notes

References

External links
Embassy of the Republic of Indonesia in Manila, Philippines
Consulate of the Republic of Indonesia in Davao City, Philippines
Embassy of the Philippines in Jakarta, Indonesia

 
Philippines
Bilateral relations of the Philippines